This is a list of notable restaurants in Sweden.

Stockholm  

  
Bacchi Wapen
Bellmansro
Berns Salonger
Blanchs café
Brostugan, Kärsön
Cattelin
Clas på Hörnet
Crazy Horse, Stockholm
Den gröne Jägaren
Den gyldene freden
Edsbacka krog
Fem små hus
Frantzén
Kaknästornet
Lady Hutton
Mathias Dahlgren
Operakällaren
Stallmästaregården

Elsewhere
Flickorna Lundgren

See also
 Lists of restaurants

Restaurants
Sweden